Bilson is a surname, and may refer to:

Bruce Bilson (born 1928), American film and television director
Carly Bilson (born 1981), Australian rowing coxwain
Danny Bilson (born 1956), American writer, director, and producer
John Bilson (disambiguation), various people
Leonard Bilson (disambiguation), various people
Malcolm Bilson (born 1935), American pianist and musicologist
Rachel Bilson (born 1981), American actress
Sundance Bilson-Thompson, Australian theoretical particle physicist.
Thomas Bilson (disambiguation) various people

See also
Billson